Events in the year 1892 in Germany.

Incumbents

National level
 Kaiser – Wilhelm II
 Chancellor – Leo von Caprivi

State level

Kingdoms
 King of Bavaria – Otto of Bavaria
 King of Prussia – Kaiser Wilhelm II
 King of Saxony – Albert of Saxony
 King of Württemberg – William II of Württemberg

Grand Duchies
 Grand Duke of Baden – Frederick I
 Grand Duke of Hesse – Louis IV to 13 March, then Ernest Louis
 Grand Duke of Mecklenburg-Schwerin – Frederick Francis III
 Grand Duke of Mecklenburg-Strelitz – Frederick William
 Grand Duke of Oldenburg – Peter II
 Grand Duke of Saxe-Weimar-Eisenach – Charles Alexander

Principalities
 Schaumburg-Lippe – Adolf I, Prince of Schaumburg-Lippe
 Schwarzburg-Rudolstadt – Günther Victor, Prince of Schwarzburg-Rudolstadt
 Schwarzburg-Sondershausen – Karl Günther, Prince of Schwarzburg-Sondershausen
 Principality of Lippe – Woldemar, Prince of Lippe
 Reuss Elder Line – Heinrich XXII, Prince Reuss of Greiz
 Reuss Younger Line – Heinrich XIV, Prince Reuss Younger Line
 Waldeck and Pyrmont – George Victor, Prince of Waldeck and Pyrmont

Duchies
 Duke of Anhalt – Frederick I, Duke of Anhalt
 Duke of Brunswick – Prince Albert of Prussia (regent)
 Duke of Saxe-Altenburg – Ernst I, Duke of Saxe-Altenburg
 Duke of Saxe-Coburg and Gotha – Ernst II, Duke of Saxe-Coburg and Gotha
 Duke of Saxe-Meiningen – Georg II, Duke of Saxe-Meiningen

Colonial Governors
 Cameroon (Kamerun) – Bruno von Schuckmann (acting governor) to 5 January, then Eugen von Zimmerer (3rd term)
 German East Africa (Deutsch-Ostafrika) – Julius Freiherr von Soden
 German New Guinea (Deutsch-Neuguinea) – Fritz Rose (commissioner) to 31 August, then Georg Schmiele (Landeshauptleute of the German New Guinea Company) from 1 September
 German South-West Africa (Deutsch-Südwestafrika) – Curt von François (commissioner)
 Togoland – vacant to 4 June, then Jesko von Puttkamer (acting commissioner) (2nd term)

Events
 25 July – German football club Hertha BSC is founded in Berlin.

Undated
 German Open Tennis Championships is founded in Hamburg.
 Travemünde Week in Travemünde is started.
 Berlin Philharmonic is founded in Berlin.

Births

 4 January – Siegfried Lehman, German-Israeli educator (died 1958)
 14 January – Martin Niemöller, German anti-Nazi theologian and Lutheran pastor (died 1984)
 16 January – Wilhelm von Apell, German general (died 1969)
 29 January – Ernst Lubitsch, German film director (died 1947)
 2 February – Cuno Hoffmeister, German astronomer (died 1968)
 2 March – Felix Bressart, German actor (died 1949)
 10 March – Hans Steinhoff, German film director (died 1945)
 22 March – Johannes Frießner, German general (died 1971)
 30 March – Erhard Milch, German field marshal of Luftwaffe (died 1972)
 1 April – Anton Storch, German politician (died 1975)
 3 April – Hans Rademacher, German mathematician (died 1969)
 23 April – Richard Huelsenbeck, German poet and writer (died 1974)
 30 April – Gottlob Bauknecht, German businessman (died 1976)
 2 May:
 Trude Hesterberg, German actress (died 1967)
 Manfred von Richthofen, German fighter pilot (died 1918)
 12 June – Ferdinand Schörner, German field marshal (died 1973)
 22 June – Robert Ritter von Greim, German field marshal (died 1945)
 27 June – Erich Köhler, German politician (died 1958)
 12 July – Harry Piel, German actor and film director (died 1963)
 15 July – Walter Benjamin, German philosopher and cultural critic (died 1940)
 22 July – Arthur Seyss-Inquart, German politician (died 1946)
 13 September – Victoria Louise of Prussia, German noblewoman (died 1980)
 23 September – Lorenz Jaeger, German cardinal of Roman Catholic Church (died 1975)
 3 October – Bernhard Schweitzer, German archaeologist (died 1966)
 9 November – Erich Auerbach, German philologist, scholar, and literature critic (died 1957)
 24 November – Karl Steinhoff, German politician (died 1981)
 1 December – Walter Bathe, German swimmer (died 1959)
 19 December – Max Seydewitz, German politician (died 1987)

Deaths

 Undated – William Julius Mann, theologian (born 1819)
 7 January – Ernst Wilhelm von Brücke, German physician and physiologist (born 1819)
 16 January – Prince Kraft zu Hohenlohe-Ingelfingen, German general and military writer (born 1827)
 5 February – Theodor Marsson, German botanist (born 1816)
 13 March – Louis IV, Grand Duke of Hesse (born 1837)
 14 March – Carl Siegmund Franz Credé, German gynecologist and obstetrician (born 1819)
 21 April – Princess Alexandrine of Prussia (born 1803)
 5 May – August Wilhelm von Hofmann, German chemist (born 1818)
 20 June – Albert Wolff, German sculptor (born 1814)
 5 August – Henriette Feuerbach, German author (born 1812)
 16 October – Georg Bleibtreu, German painter (born 1828)
 28 October – Felix Otto Dessoff, German conductor (born 1835)
 6 November – Wilhelm Maurenbrecher, German historian (born 1838)
 6 December – Werner von Siemens, German inventor and industrialist (born 1816)
 28 December – Vincent Stoltenberg Lerche, Norwegian painter (born 1837).

Literature
Frank Wedekind's magnum opus drama "Das Erwachen des Fruhlings" or "Spring Awakening" is set during this year with one of the play's protagonists Wendla Bergmann's death occurring on October 27.

References

 
Years of the 19th century in Germany
Germany
Germany